Last Conversation Piece is a public artwork by Spanish sculptor Juan Muñoz in the collection of the Hirshhorn Museum and Sculpture Garden in Washington, DC, United States. The piece is currently on loan to The Contemporary Austin.

Description

This sculpture consists of three pieces which display five figures with bulbous bodies (reminiscent of punching bags). Three are huddled together having a conversation, while two are at opposite ends of the space, moving towards the three in conversation. The three figures seem almost violent in their discussion while the two who rush towards them show concern. They are placed on a grassy area of the sculpture garden.

Gallery

Acquisition

The sculpture was originally on display at the Marian Goodman Gallery in New York City up until April 13, 1995. The piece was a museum purchase made the same year and was put on display in March 1996. In 2019, the Hirshhorn loaned the sculpture to The Contemporary Austin. It went on exhibition in November of that year.

Information

Last Conversation Piece served as the final in his "conversation piece" series. Muñoz became weary of the series and chose to expand out in styles as a protest of being lumped into a single sculptural genre.

See also
 List of public art in Washington, D.C., Ward 2

References

External links
A photo montage of the piece on YouTube
Last Conversation Piece video by Rupert Chappelle
Last Conversation Piece on Waymarking

Modernist sculpture
1995 sculptures
Hirshhorn Museum and Sculpture Garden
Sculptures of the Smithsonian Institution
Bronze sculptures in Washington, D.C.
Oral communication
Outdoor sculptures in Washington, D.C.